Antonio Cuéllar Steffan (born 10 May 1968) is a Mexican politician and lawyer affiliated with the PVEM. He currently serves as Deputy of the LXII Legislature of the Mexican Congress representing Aguascalientes.

References

1968 births
Living people
People from Mexico City
20th-century Mexican lawyers
National Autonomous University of Mexico alumni
Ecologist Green Party of Mexico politicians
21st-century Mexican politicians
Deputies of the LXII Legislature of Mexico
Members of the Chamber of Deputies (Mexico) for Aguascalientes
21st-century Mexican lawyers